The Hungarian Wikipedia is the Hungarian/Magyar version of Wikipedia, the free encyclopedia. Started on July 8, 2003, this version reached the 300,000-article milestone in May 2015. The 500,000th article was born on February 16, 2022.

History
The first Wikipedia related to the Hungarian language was created on September 5, 2001, by Larry Sanger, the English language Wikipedia coordinator at the time. At that time Wikipedia was still running on UseModWiki. For many months there was little Hungarian content, and there were problems with vandalism.

The Hungarian Wikipedia as it is known today was launched by Péter Gervai on July 8, 2003. Since its launch it has been growing steadily, moving up in the multilingual ranking from 34th place in 2003 to 18th place in December 2005 and 17th in December 2009, then dropping slightly to 19th place in September 2011.

On October 31, 2010, the Hungarian Wikipedia contained 179,894 articles with 8,992,153 edits by 38 administrators, 153,779 registered users as well as many unregistered ones.

On 14 January 2013, the Hungarian Wikipedia became the first to enable the provision of interlanguage links via Wikidata.

Milestones
The Hungarian Wikipedia reached the 50,000-article milestone on February 7, 2007, the 100,000th on July 17, 2008, and the 150,000th on December 25, 2009, by which it matched the size of the first complete Hungarian encyclopedia, the Pallas's Great Lexicon. The 200,000-article milestone was reached in September 2011, and it was marked by a new version of the Wikipedia globe showing 200,000 moving onward.

On June 17, 2010, the number of featured articles reached 500.

On 7 May 2015 Hungarian Wikipedia reached 300,000 articles.

The 400,000th article was born on December 15, 2016.

The Hungarian Wikipedia reached 500,000 articles on February 16, 2022.

Most disputed articles
According to a 2013 Oxford University study, the most-disputed article on the Hungarian Wikipedia was "Gypsy crime".

Gallery

References

External links

  Hungarian Wikipedia
  Hungarian Wikipedia mobile version
  Archived pages from the arcane times of the Hungarian Wikipedia
  Hungarian Wikipedia major events
  Hungarian Wikipedia milestones
  Press articles about the Hungarian Wikipedia

Wikipedias by language
Internet properties established in 2003
Hungarian-language websites
Hungarian encyclopedias